American singer Teyana Taylor has released three studio albums, one compilation album, three mixtapes, and fifteen singles (including three as a featured artist and two promotional singles). In 2009, Taylor released her first mixtape, From a Planet Called Harlem, which included her debut single "Google Me". It debuted at its peak of number ninety on the US Hot R&B/Hip-Hop Songs chart. Around this time, Taylor featured on songs with the likes of Trey Songz, Missy Elliott, and Kanye West. Taylor has spoken about her inspiration from fellow female musician Lauryn Hill, which was noted with the release of her second mixtape in 2012. The mixtape, entitled The Misunderstanding of Teyana Taylor, takes its name from Hill's album The Miseducation of Lauryn Hill.

Later that year, Taylor contributed to her labels compilation album, Cruel Summer. The album went on to debut at number two on the Billboard 200, while it topped both the Top R&B/Hip-Hop Albums and Rap Albums charts. One of her contributions to the album, "To the World", peaked at seventy on the Billboard Hot 100, ninety-two on the Canadian Hot 100, and ninety-four on the UK Singles Chart. On November 4, 2014, Taylor released her debut studio album, titled VII. The album debuted on the Billboard 200 at number nineteen, and topped the Top R&B/Hip-Hop Albums and R&B Albums chart. VII spawned two singles. The first, "Maybe", featured Pusha T and Yo Gotti, and peaked at number thirteen on the Billboard Bubbling Under Hot 100 Singles chart. The second single from the album was titled "Do Not Disturb", and featured fellow R&B singer Chris Brown. In 2015, Taylor released her third free-download mixtape, The Cassette Tape 1994.

On June 23, 2018, Taylor released her second studio album K.T.S.E., short for Keep That Same Energy, the last of five similarly brief GOOD Music projects overseen and co-produced by Kanye West in Wyoming. It debuted at number seventeen and yielded the Gold-certified singles "Gonna Love Me" and "Issues/Hold On". After a few preview tracks scattered across 2019 and the first half of 2020, most notably the Gold-certified single "How You Want It?," she delivered The Album on Juneteenth of the latter year. It secured her second number one on Billboard'''s Top R&B Albums and first top ten on the Billboard'' 200 chart.

Albums

Studio albums

Compilation albums

Mixtapes

Singles

As lead artist

As featured artist

Promotional singles

Other charted songs

Guest appearances

Music videos

Notes

References

Discographies of American artists
Hip hop discographies